Bernhard Sabel (1957, Trier) is a German psychologist who heads the Institute of Medical Psychology at the Otto-von-Guericke-University Magdeburg.

Sabel investigates treatment options for visual impairments through the activation and rehabilitation of residual vision. His work has appeared in over 200 publication.

Research interests 
Sabel's basic and clinical research work focuses on brain plasticity and vision restoration.  Based on this work with animal models of vision loss and his clinical work, he discovered that low vision and blindness must not be viewed as irreversible, but that it can be improved or restored to some extent, even long after the damage has occurred.

The underlying theory and mechanisms of vision restoration were spelled out by the “hypothesis of residual vision activation”.  It states that in patients with visual impairments, residual vision can be activated again by means of vision training exercises or non-invasive brain current stimulation.  By reactivating previously hypometabolic, inactive (“silent”) neurons, visual function can thus recover, improving not only vision test results but also subjective vision and quality of life.

Sabel showed that vision restoration is independent of the person's age, sex, and duration of the damage, but that it depends primarily on the degree of how much residual vision the patients still have. Most recently, he discovered that the mental stress has a negative influence on vision restoration while relaxation techniques (such as meditation) improve outcome.

Publications 
Sabel's work has been published in Science, Nature Medicine, Archives of Neurology, Neurology, and Neuroimage..

Sabel has published over 240 science publications since 1979 in international SCI journals, 10 books, and over 40 book-chapters related to the topic of brain plasticity and vision restoration following glaucoma, optic neuropathy and stroke. Sabel has given over 500 lectures at national and international conferences. Since 1997 Sabel has been the Editor-in-Chief of the SCI journal Restorative Neurology and Neuroscience.  He is the author of 10 books, including:

 Stein, D.G. and Sabel, B.A. (Eds.) (1988). Pharmacological Approaches to the Treatment of Brain and Spinal Cord Injury: New York, Plenum Press.
 Freund, H.-J., Sabel, B.A. and Witte, O. (Eds.) (1997). Brain Plasticity: Lippincott/Raven Press.
 Charness, N., Park, D.C. and Sabel, B.A. (Eds.) (2001). Communication, Technology and Aging: Springer Publishing Corporation.
 Sabel, B. (2016) Restoring Low Vision, Monograph, 278 pages (German Translation: “Wieder sehen”, 2018), both published by AMAZON.

Selected publications 

 Kasten, E., Wüst, S., Behrens-Baumann, W. and Sabel, B.A. (1998). Computer-based training for the treatment of partial blindness. Nature medicine 4: 1083–1087.
 Sabel, B.A., Engelmann, R. and Humphrey, M.M. (1997). In vivo confocal neuroimaging of CNS neurons (ICON). Nature medicine 3: 244–247.
 Sabel, B.A., Fedorov, A., Henrich-Noack, P. and Gall, C. (2011). Vision restoration after brain damage: The “Residual Vision Activation Theory”. Progress in Brain Research 192: 199–262.
 Bola, M., Gall, C., Moewes, C., Fedorov, A., Hinrichs, H., Sabel, B.A. (2014). Brain functional connectivity network breakdown and restoration in blindness. Neurology 83 (6): 542-551
 Gall, C., Schmidt, S., Schittkowski, M.P., Antal, A., Ambrus, G.G., Paulus, W., Dannhauer, M., Michalik, R., Mante, A., Bola, M., Lux, A., Kropf, S., Brandt, S.A., Sabel, B.A. (2016). Alternating current stimulation for vision restoration after optic nerve damage: a randomized clinical trial. PLoS One 11: e0156134.
 Sabel, B.A., Wang, J., Cárdenas-Morales, L., Faiq, M., Heim, C. (2018). Mental stress as consequence and cause of vision loss: the dawn of psychosomatic ophthalmology for preventive and personalized medicine. EPMA Journal 9: 133–160.
 Sabel, B.A., Flammer, J, and Merabet, L.B. (2018) Residual vision activation and the brain-eye-vascular triad: dysregulation, plasticity and restoration in low vision and blindness – a review. Restorative Neurology and Neuroscience 36: 767-791

References

External links 
 Publications by Bernhard Sabel at PubMed
 Sabel on ResearchGate
 Professor portrait at Otto von Guericke University Magdeburg
 Portrait page in the research portal Saxony-Anhalt
 Clinical services by Sabel at SAVIR Center

Living people
1957 births
German psychologists
University of Trier alumni
Heinrich Heine University Düsseldorf alumni
Clark University alumni